Jung Sung-il (born 1980) is a South Korean actor. He gained recognition for his appearance in the Netflix original series The Glory (2022–2023).

Filmography

Film

Television

Theater

References

External links 
 
 

1980 births
Living people
21st-century South Korean male actors
South Korean male stage actors
South Korean male television actors
South Korean male film actors